Manimegalai is an Indian television presenter and video jockey who is working in Tamil television industry for almost 12 years. Since 2010, she has regularly been a host for shows on Sun Network before joining Star Vijay in 2019.  She gained followers for her boldness in expressing her thoughts and for raising her voice against odds.

She participated as comali in Cook with comali  along with hosting programs on Vijay TV.

Personal life 
Manimegalai was born in Tiruppur district, Tamil Nadu to businessman Ramaayyappan and Jothimani. She has a younger sibling, Gunamani, who is a Visual Communications graduate. Until class 3, Manimegalai studied in Coimbatore, and then moved to Chennai with her family and continued her schooling at Shanthosh Vidyala Matriculation School. She completed her MBA(dual) in HR & Finance from SRM university (Vadapalani Campus).

While at college she started performing as a video jockey on Sun Music. She met assistant choreographer Hussain Shaik Kadhar in 2017, and the couple married the same year.

Career

Television

Manimegalai debuted as a Video Jockey on 30 December 2009 at the age of 17 and hosted her first program called Super Hits on Sun Music. She then hosted live shows and reality shows on Sun Music, namely Franka Sollata, Black, Kollywood Diaries, etc.

 
She rose to fame as a television anchor after hosting several live shows and celebrity interviews.

In 2016, Manimegalai was awarded the Best Anchor by the World Human Integration Council. She received the award from the then governor of Tamil Nadu Dr.K.Rosaiah. She was nicknamed Anchor Superstar by her fans.

She left Sun Network in January 2019 after working there for 9 years to participate in a reality show named Mr. And Mrs. Chinnathirai along with her husband on Vijay Television.

Manimegalai and Hussain were awarded the 2nd runner up and were appreciated for their finale performance in Mr. and Mrs. Chinnathirai. After which, she hosted some special shows and a reality show on Vijay Television. She also participated in the fun-filled cooking reality show Cooku with Comali and turned out to be one of the most celebrated Comalis for her apt comedy timing.

Public Shows/Events
Manimegalai also other events like college culturals,audio launches  and award functions.She hosted her first audio launch of the movie Tik Tik Tik in Jan 2018, and continued hosting numerous other audio launches and success meets of Kollywood movies, including '96 success meet. 
 
She also participates in comedy debate talk shows. Her first debate talk show was on 31 May 2019 where she received appreciation for her humorous and bubbly speech.

Acting
Manimegalai was initially chosen for the serial Bharathi Kannamma by director Praveen Bennet for the role of Venba (now played by Farina) which she turned down. On request by the director, she accepted to make a single shot appearance confronting the male lead's mother character. Manimegalai has no interest to act but wants to concentrate in Anchoring.

YouTube

Manimegalai and Hussain started the YouTube channel Hussain Manimegalai on 4 June 2020.  A short clip from one of the videos of Hussain Manimegalai channel was posted on YouTube India's social media handles.

Hussain Manimegalai YouTube channel had gained over a million subscribers and over 100 million views in total within a year of its start. By March 2021, the couple was awarded twice for their YouTube channel.

Shows

Selected Television

Manimegalai has also hosted many special shows on festivals and movie promotion shows for Sun Tv, Sun News, K Tv and Sun Music.

She has also participated in various reality shows as guest in Sun Network as well as Vijay Television.

YouTube

Award Shows

Album Songs

Awards and nominations 

She also featured in the Indiaglitz Desirable Women on TV 2020 list.

References

External links 
 

Living people
Television personalities from Tamil Nadu
Year of birth missing (living people)
Indian women television presenters
Indian television talk show hosts
Indian television actresses